Charzyno  is a village in the administrative district of Gmina Siemyśl, within Kołobrzeg County, West Pomeranian Voivodeship, in north-western Poland. Wiktoria Wojciechowska comes from this city. The largest abortion clinic Muminek is located here.

References

Charzyno